Wishing on the Moon is an album by jazz vocalist Meredith D'Ambrosio that was recorded in 2004 and released by Sunnyside in 2006.

Reception 

The Allmusic review states, "It is difficult not to use some of liner note author Doug Ramsey's many adjectives to describe this marvelous singer, who is able to tell a story effortlessly with her pure, unaffected vocals, backed by the excellent support...Whether her theme is love in bloom, love lost, loneliness, or sentiment, d'Ambrosio conveys it in her soft, swinging style. This is the perfect CD for a quiet evening with someone special". In JazzTimes, Harvey Siders wrote, "If any songwriter deserves the encomium "American original," it's Meredith d'Ambrosio. No slave to A-A-B-A or 32-measure tunes, she has always followed her own muse. Her inspiration: intimate jazz, in the story telling style of Mabel Mercer. Meredith has a small range, but tons of wit, whimsy and wisdom. There's no doubt she's a bona fide jazz singer".

Track listing 
All compositions by Meredith D'Ambrosio except where noted
 "Have You Noticed?" – 4:53
 "I'd Do It All Again" – 5:43
 "Don't Follow Me" – 4:58
 "In the Glow of the Moon" (Dena DeRose, Meredith D'Ambrosio) – 5:43
 "Melodious Funk" – 5:21
 "Stay with Me" – 6:09
 "Try as I May" – 4:42
 "Wishing on the Moon" – 5:15
 "Miracle of Spring" – 4:29
 "Angels without Their Wings" (Meredith D'Ambrosio, Bradford Langer) – 5:13

Personnel 
 Meredith D'Ambrosio – vocals
 Don Sickler – trumpet, flugelhorn
 Cecilia Coleman – piano
 Tim Givens – double bass
 Vince Cherico – drums

References 

Meredith D'Ambrosio albums
2006 albums
Sunnyside Records albums
Albums recorded at Van Gelder Studio